The Sportsmen's Tennis Club Challenger was a tournament for professional female tennis players played on outdoor hard courts. The event was classified as a $50,000 ITF Women's Circuit tournament and was held in Boston, United States, from 2007 to 2011.

Past finals

Singles

Doubles

External links 
 ITF search

ITF Women's World Tennis Tour
Hard court tennis tournaments in the United States
Recurring sporting events established in 2007
Recurring sporting events disestablished in 2011
Tennis in Massachusetts